John Bagley may refer to:
 John Bagley (basketball) (born 1960), former American basketball player
 John F. Bagley, American head college football coach
 John H. Bagley Jr. (1832–1902), United States Representative from New York
 John J. Bagley (1832–1881), U.S. politician